Chapel of Our Lady Help of Christians, also known as the Maria Hilf Chapel, is a historic Roman Catholic church located at Cheektowaga in Erie County, New York. It is part of the Diocese of Buffalo.

Description
The Chapel of Our Lady Help of Christians was constructed in 1853, in the Greek Revival style, as a religious center for the rural Alsatian community and pilgrimage site for urban Alsatian, German, Polish, and Italian immigrants to Our Lady Help of Christians.  The interior features a barrel vault ceiling, wooden church mobiliary, frescos, paintings, and other features that reflect an Alsatian village church.

It was listed on the National Register of Historic Places in 1978.

Further reading 
Atwell, Glenn R. and Batt, Ronald E. (1979). The Chapel: A Comprehensive History of the Chapel and Pilgrimage of Our Lady Help of Christians, Cheektowaga, New York and of the Alsatian Immigrant Community at Williamsville, New York. Buffalo, NY, The Holling Press, Inc.

References

External links

French-American culture in New York (state)
German-American culture in New York (state)
Polish-American culture in New York (state)
Italian-American culture in New York (state)
Churches on the National Register of Historic Places in New York (state)
Greek Revival church buildings in New York (state)
Roman Catholic churches completed in 1853
19th-century Roman Catholic church buildings in the United States
Roman Catholic churches in New York (state)
Churches in Erie County, New York
National Register of Historic Places in Erie County, New York
Roman Catholic chapels in the United States